Thecamoebidae is an Amoebozoa family.

Dermamoeba has been classified in this group. However, there is recent evidence that it is not closely related to the other members of this group.

See also
 Sappinia diploidea

References

Amoebozoa families
Discosea